Leonid Ivanovich Babashov (born January 31, 1966, Petrovka, Krasnohvardiiske Raion, Crimea) is a Russian political figure, deputy of the 8th State Duma convocation. After graduating from the Kyiv Civil Engineering Institute in 1995; he started working as an entrepreneur. From 2014 to 2021, he was a deputy of the State Council of Crimea of the 1st and 2nd convocations. 

Since September 2021, he has served as a deputy of the 8th State Duma convocation. Despite being a member of the United Russia, he ran as an independent candidate from the Republic of Crimea constituency.

Babashov has been married twice and has three children.

References

1966 births
Living people
People from Krasnohvardiiske Raion
United Russia politicians
21st-century Russian politicians
Eighth convocation members of the State Duma (Russian Federation)